The Kutubu hardyhead (Craterocephalus lacustris) is a species of fish in the family Atherinidae. It is endemic to Lake Kutubu and its outlet, the Soro River, in the Kikori River system, Papua New Guinea. Within its range this species is extremely abundant and large schools may be formed in the shallow margins of the lake, both in open water and among the aquatic vegetation. This species was described by Ethelwynn Trewavas in 1940.

References

Craterocephalus
Freshwater fish of Papua New Guinea
Fish described in 1940
Taxonomy articles created by Polbot